The German Women's National Football Team started play in 1983. Women's football was long met with skepticism in Germany, and official matches were banned by the DFB until 1970. However, the women's national team has grown in popularity since winning the World Cup in 2003, as it was chosen as Germany's Sports Team of the Year. As of August 2020, Germany is ranked 2nd in the FIFA Women's World Rankings.

The German national team is one of the most successful in women's football. They are two-time world champions, having won the 2003 and 2007 tournaments. Germany is also the only nation to have won both the women's and men's tournament. The team has won eight of the twelve UEFA European Championships, claiming six consecutive titles between 1995 and 2013.

1982–1999

1982–1989

1990–1999

2000–2019

2000–2009

2010–2019

2020–2039

2020–2029

Head-to-head records

References

Germany women's national football team
Women's national association football team results